Bolesławice  is a village in the administrative district of Gmina Kobylnica, within Słupsk County, Pomeranian Voivodeship, in northern Poland.

As of 2011, the village had a population of 280.

References

Villages in Słupsk County